Orlando Tive "Baby Lane" Anderson (August 13, 1974 – May 29, 1998) was an American gangster who is the prime suspect in the murder of Tupac Shakur. Anderson belonged to the California-based gang known as the  Southside Compton Crips. Detective Tim Brennan of the Compton Police Department filed an affidavit naming Anderson as a suspect; he denied involvement and was never charged. Anderson was killed in an unrelated gang shootout at the age of 23.

Murder of Tupac Shakur

In July 1996, Anderson was involved in an altercation at the Lakewood Mall, where he and his entourage assaulted Trevon Lane, a member of Death Row Records, and stole his Death Row medallion. There was rumored to be a bounty placed on Death Row medallions by their rivals, the Compton Crips, of which Anderson was a respected member. This move was extremely disrespectful and infuriated Suge Knight, Tupac Shakur, and the rest of Death Row.

On September 7, 1996, after the Bruce Seldon vs. Mike Tyson fight, Trevon Lane coincidentally spotted Anderson by himself in the MGM, and told Tupac and the rest of the Death Row entourage that Anderson was the one responsible for snatching his medallion. Tupac can then be seen on the MGM’s security camera running over to Anderson with the rest of his entourage and throwing the first punch. Anderson then suffered a rather severe beatdown as he was essentially jumped by five men with no one to help him. However, according to BG Knocc Out in an interview with VladTV, Anderson escaped the worst of the beating by managing to cover his face during the attack. The fight occurred three hours before Shakur's shooting. 

Later that month, Las Vegas homicide Lt. Larry Spinosa told the media, "At this point, Orlando Anderson is not a suspect in the shooting of Tupac Shakur." Anderson was subsequently named as a suspect. Rumors circulated that he had bragged about shooting the rapper, a claim he later denied in an interview for VIBE magazine. In September 1997 Anderson told the Los Angeles Times that he was a fan of Shakur and his music, but denied being the murderer.

Anderson was detained in Compton, California a month after Shakur was shot, along with twenty-one other alleged gang members. He was not charged. However, the arrest was only tangentially connected to the Tupac shooting, as Compton police said they were investigating local shootings and not the one in Las Vegas. Las Vegas police discounted Anderson as a suspect, according to a Los Angeles Times article, because the fight in which Shakur was involved in assaulting Anderson in the MGM Grand lobby had happened just hours before the shooting.

Las Vegas police failed to follow up with a member of Shakur's entourage who witnessed the shooting and who told police he could identify one or more of the assailants. That witness, rapper Yaki Kadafi, was killed two months later. The police also failed to follow up on a lead from a witness who had spotted a white Cadillac similar to the car from which the fatal shots were fired and in which the shooters escaped.

Soon after the shooting of Tupac Shakur, a gang war broke out in Compton between the Bloods and Crips. BG Knocc Out, who was close friends with Anderson, stated that Anderson was shot in the legs with an AK-47 and was confined to a wheelchair for some time.  

A year later, Shakur's mother Afeni Shakur filed a wrongful death lawsuit against Anderson in response to a lawsuit he had filed against Death Row Records CEO Suge Knight, Death Row associates, and Shakur's estate. Anderson's lawsuit sought damages for injuries resulting from the MGM Grand scuffle, and for emotional and physical pain. Afeni Shakur's lawsuit was filed just four days after Anderson's. The Associated Press reported in 2000 that Shakur and Anderson's estates settled the competing lawsuits just hours before Anderson's death. Anderson's lawyer claimed the settlement would have netted Anderson $78,000.

In October 2011, former LAPD Detective Greg Kading, a former investigator in the murder of Christopher "Biggie Smalls" Wallace, released a book alleging that Sean "Diddy" Combs commissioned Anderson's uncle, Duane "Keefe D" Davis, to kill Shakur, as well as Knight, for $1 million. Kading and Davis claimed that Anderson was present in the vehicle that pulled up next to the BMW in which Tupac was shot. In a recorded conversation with Kading, Davis claimed Anderson fired the shots that killed Tupac.

Each account said that four men were in the white Cadillac that pulled up alongside the BMW that Knight and Shakur were riding in on the night of the shooting. The accounts independently reported that Anderson was in the back seat of the Cadillac and shot Shakur by leaning out of the back window. Kading and Philips claimed that the Crips were offered a $1 million bounty to kill Knight and Shakur. However, the two accounts differ on whether the bounty was offered by Combs (as reported by Kading) or by Wallace (as reported by Philips).

2000s investigations 
In 2002, the Los Angeles Times published a two-part series by reporter Chuck Philips titled "Who Killed Tupac Shakur?" that looked into the events leading to the crime. The series indicated that "the shooting was carried out by a Compton gang called the Southside Crips to avenge the beating of one of its members by Shakur a few hours earlier. Orlando Anderson, the Crip whom Shakur had attacked, fired the fatal shots. Las Vegas police interviewed Anderson only once as a possible suspect. He was later killed in an unrelated gang shooting." The Times series included references to the cooperation of East Coast rappers including Wallace, Shakur's rival at the time, and New York City criminals.

Before their deaths, both Wallace and Anderson denied any role in Shakur's murder. In support of this, Wallace's family produced computerized invoices showing that he was working in a New York recording studio the night of the shooting. Wallace's manager Wayne Barrow and fellow rapper Lil' Cease made public announcements denying Wallace had a role in the crime and stating that they were both with him in the recording studio.

Times assistant managing editor Mark Duvoisin defended Philips' series, stating they were based on police affidavits and court documents as well as interviews with investigators, witnesses to the crime and members of the Southside Crips. Duvoisin stated: "Philips' story has withstood all challenges to its accuracy...[and] remains the definitive account of the Shakur slaying." The main thrust of the articles, implicating Anderson and the Crips, was later corroborated by Kading's 2011 book Murder Rap and discussed in author Cathy Scott's 2002 book The Killing of Tupac Shakur. Scott refuted the theory in a People magazine article, saying there was no evidence pointing to Wallace as a suspect. Also, The New York Times wrote, "The Los Angeles Times articles did not offer any documentation to show that Wallace was in Las Vegas that night."

In her book, Scott reviews various theories, including the Knight theory, before stating, "Years after the primary investigations, it's still anyone's guess. No one was ever arrested but no one was ever ruled out as a suspect, either." She then (in 2002) wrote that one theory "transcends all the others, and implicates the white record-company power brokers themselves," implicating the bosses of the Suge Knight label. In recent years, however, archived letters of Scott's responses to readers show an evolution toward Anderson as a suspect and a dismissal of the Knight theory.

Death 
Anderson died on May 29, 1998, at Martin Luther King Jr.–Harbor Hospital in Willowbrook, California, after he was shot during a gang-related shootout in Compton.

See also
List of unsolved murders

References

1974 births
1998 deaths
1998 murders in the United States
20th-century American musicians
Crips
Deaths by firearm in California
Male murder victims
Murdered African-American people
People from Compton, California
People murdered in California
Tupac Shakur
Unsolved murders in the United States
Murdered gangsters
20th-century African-American people